The 2021–22 Indigo Group Premiership was the second season of the new format of the Welsh Premiership, the top tier of club rugby in Wales run by the Welsh Rugby Union. It was contested by twelve Welsh clubs following a reduction from sixteen teams at the end of the 2018–19 season. The competition was won by Cardiff who had last won the 2008-09 competition.

Structure 
For 2021–22, instead of a traditional league each team played each other team either home or away for a total of 11 games. League points were awarded – 4 points for a win, 2 for a draw and 0 for a loss. Teams could also earn an additional bonus point by scoring four or more tries in a match and/or losing by less than seven points. The club with the most points at the end of 11 games were declared the winners. As the previous two seasons were disrupted during the COVID-19 pandemic, there was no relegation.

Teams 
As the previous seasons (2019-20 & 2020-21) were cancelled due to the COVID-19 pandemic, no teams were promoted or relegated from any league. Therefore, the same 12 teams that competed in 2020-21 competed again in 2021-22.

Standings

References

External links 
 

Welsh Premier Division seasons
Premiership
Wales